The bantay dagat, also known as the sea patrol, are community-based, volunteer organizations in the Philippines that work with local and national government officials and within 15 kilometers of the shore to protect the marine environment, especially patrolling against illegal fishing, and to provide assistance in rescue operations.  It is under the Bureau of Fisheries and Aquatic Resources (BFAR) of the Philippine Department of Agriculture.

Bantay Dagat is "a participatory approach designed for coastal law enforcement which has existed in the Philippines since the 1970s." The current structure was founded in 1994 at the behest of Philippine Senator Santanina Rasul.  They work with the Department of Agriculture, Department of the Interior and Local Government, the Philippine Navy and the Philippine Coast Guard, among others. By the year 2000, there were over 100,000 Bantay Dagat volunteers.

There have been several incidents of Bantay Dagat leaders being killed, such as in Batangas in 2009.

The volunteers may receive a small honorarium as well as other benefits, similar to Philippine tanods, land-based, community watchmen.

See also 
 Philippine Coast Guard

References

External links 
 Verde Island Passage Bantay Dagat Portal
  (Includes footage of patrols and stops. From Camarines Norte, Philippines. Not in English)

Environmental organizations based in the Philippines
Coast guards
Sea rescue organizations
Law enforcement in the Philippines
Tagalog words and phrases